Dejan Musli (born January 3, 1991) is a Serbian professional basketball player for MoraBanc Andorra of the Liga ACB.

Professional career

FMP
In the youth Musli won the Euroleague Basketball Nike International Junior Tournament twice with FMP dominating in the paint and winning MVP awards, which made him one of the most promising young players of his generation. In January 2009, Musli signed his first professional four-year contract with FMP, team where he spent previous 2 seasons at the junior level. In the summer of 2009, he won with his team the 2009 EuroLeague's NIJT junior tournament, after defeating the Lithuanian Lietuvos rytas. He scored 31 points and grabbed 17 rebounds in the final game, while also guarding Jonas Valančiūnas who scored 22 points. Despite being one of the most promising European players, in March 2010 Musli decided not to enter the 2010 NBA draft.

Caja Laboral
On September 22, 2010, Musli signed a five-year contract with the Spanish team Caja Laboral. In first season with the team, he saw very little playing time, also having played only two games in his first EuroLeague season.

In February 2011, Musli was loaned to the Italian team Montegranaro until the end of season, but was quickly sent back due to concerns about his poor work ethic and questionable attitude. Officially, he didn't play any game for Montegranaro due to illness. In October 2011 he was loaned on one-month assignment to the Spanish side Fuenlabrada, in order to return his game shape.

In February 2012, he was once again loaned, this time to Mega Vizura until the end of the season. Over the course of season, he averaged 9.1 points and 6.4 rebounds in the Basketball League of Serbia. He played just ten games over two years in all competitions with Caja Laboral.

Partizan
On 18 July 2012, shortly after terminating his contract with Caja Laboral, Musli signed a three-year contract with Partizan Belgrade, with option to leave after two seasons. In the first EuroLeague season with Partizan, he averaged 9.5 points and 4.9 rebounds over 10 games. After solid first season in Partizan, Musli's minutes per game dropped slightly in his second season with the team, which also reflected on his stats. He averaged 5.3 points and 3.1 rebounds over 23 EuroLeague games. In April 2014, at the Basketball League of Serbia game against Crnokosa, he scored season-high 22 points and added 5 rebounds while spending only 13 minutes on the court. In 2014, he won his second straight and club's 13th consecutive Serbian League defeating Red Star Belgrade with 3-1 in the final series.

Mega Leks
On December 30, 2014, Musli signed with Mega Leks for the rest of the season. In a debut for the new team against Cibona, he scored 26 points and grabbed 5 rebounds. Over 10 games in the Adriatic League, he averaged 15 points and 9.2 rebounds per game.

Bàsquet Manresa
On 17 August 2015, Musli signed a one-year contract with the Spanish club Bàsquet Manresa. On 25 October 2015, Musli was named ACB Player of the Month of October after averaging 14.7 points and 9.0 rebounds in the first three games of the season.

He finished the season as the top rated player with 19.7 Performance Index Rating points per game and was part of the All-ACB Second Team.

Unicaja
On 9 June 2016, Musli signed a two-year contract with the Spanish club Unicaja. In April 2017, Musli won the EuroCup with Unicaja after beating Valencia BC in the Finals. On December 7, 2017, he parted ways with Unicaja.

Brose Bamberg

On December 8, 2017, Musli signed with German club Brose Bamberg for the rest of the 2017–18 season.

International career
Musli played for Serbian national team at the 2007 FIBA Europe Under-16 Championship in Greece and won a gold medal. He was named the tournament MVP averaging 16.3 points, 11.8 rebounds and 5.1 blocks per game.

Career statistics

EuroLeague

|-
| style="text-align:left;"| 2010–11
| style="text-align:left;"| Baskonia
| 2 || 0 || 2.0 || .000 || .000 || .500 || 1.0 || .0 || .0 || .0 || .5 || -2.0
|-
| style="text-align:left;"| 2012–13
| style="text-align:left;" rowspan=2| Partizan
| 10 || 8 || 21.6 || .527 || .000 || .773 || 4.9 || 1.0 || .8 || .4 || 9.5 || 9.8
|-
| style="text-align:left;"| 2013–14
| 23 || 7 || 14.6 || .495 || .000 || .538 || 3.1 || .3 || .3 || .1 || 5.3 || 5.4
|-
| style="text-align:left;"| 2017–18
| style="text-align:left;"| Unicaja
| 9 || 1 || 11.2 || .576 || .000 || .550 || 2.7 || .4 || .0 || .3 || 5.4 || 6.9
|-
| style="text-align:left;"| 2017–18
| style="text-align:left;"| Bamberg
| 15 || 8 || 19.8 || .594 || .000 || .678 || 6.1 || 1.4 || .3 || .3 || 10.4 || 14.4
|- class="sortbottom"
| style="text-align:left;"| Career
| style="text-align:left;"|
| 68 || 25 || 15.5 || .542 || .000 || .632 || 4.1 || .7 || .3 || .2 || 7.2 || 8.2

References

External links
 Dejan Musli at aba-liga.com
 Dejan Musli at acb.com
 Dejan Musli at draftexpress.com
 Dejan Musli at eurobasket.com
 Dejan Musli at euroleague.net
 Dejan Musli at fiba.com
 

1991 births
Living people
ABA League players
Baloncesto Fuenlabrada players
Baloncesto Málaga players
Basketball League of Serbia players
Bàsquet Manresa players
BC Andorra players
Expatriate basketball people in Andorra
Brose Bamberg players
Centers (basketball)
KK FMP (1991–2011) players
KK Mega Basket players
KK Partizan players
Liga ACB players
People from Prizren
Saski Baskonia players
Serbian expatriate basketball people in China
Serbian expatriate basketball people in Germany
Serbian expatriate basketball people in Spain
Serbian men's basketball players
Tianjin Pioneers players